Juan Rafael Estrella Ureña (born Santiago de los Caballeros, November 10, 1889 – May 25, 1945) was a Dominican politician and lawyer. He served as the last acting president of the Dominican Republic from March 3, 1930 until August 16, 1930, when he started to serve as the vice president under Rafael Leónidas Trujillo (he held the vice presidency until 1932).

Biography
Estrella Ureña was born on November 10, 1889, in Santiago de los Caballeros. His mother was Juana Antonia Ureña Estévez and his father was Juan Baustista Estrella Durán; he had 1 brother. He later moved with his family to live in Santo Domingo, where he studied at the University of Santo Domingo. Estrella Ureña studied law, and during his college years he mixed with young fans of the doctrines of Puerto Rican independence advocate Eugenio María de Hostos, this made him change his thinking.

Under Eladio Victoria's administration, Estrella Ureña adamantly opposed, and felt dissatisfaction with the assassination of President Ramón Cáceres. He then planned to conspire against Victoria, and with others, he founded the "Partido Liberal Reformista" or "Liberal Reformist Party" which had its fundamental ideology in the ideas of Eugenio María de Hostos. He was eventually imprisoned.

On June 9, 1917 he married Tomasina Martínez Rodríguez (1904–1989) and fathered 9 children.

By 1924, Estrella Ureña fully supported Horacio Vásquez and heavily helped his presidential campaign. In 1925, he founded the Partido Republicano (Republican Party) and was appointed to the department of Justice and Public Instruction.
Estrella conspired with the Chief of the Armed Forces, Rafael Leónidas Trujillo, and together, they cut a deal. In return for letting Estrella take power, Trujillo would be allowed to run for president in new elections. As the rebels marched toward Santo Domingo, Vásquez ordered Trujillo to suppress them. However, feigning "neutrality," Trujillo kept his men in barracks, allowing Estrella's rebels to take the capital virtually unopposed. On March 3, Estrella was proclaimed acting president with Trujillo confirmed as head of the police and the army. As per their agreement, Trujillo became the presidential nominee of the newly formed Patriotic Coalition of Citizens. Vásquez was forced to resign along with his deputy, Dr. José Dolores Alfonseca.
In 1930, Trujillo won the presidential elections and designated Estrella as his vice-president. In 1932, Estrella resigned from the vice-presidency; some say that it was on the pretext that relations between Estrella and Trujillo had become strained.

He died on May 25, 1945 of a surgical procedure. It was rumored that Trujillo was the one who had hired the surgeon to ensure that Estrella was not to survive the operation. In response, Trujillo declared a state of mourning for three days.

Sources
Biography at the Enciclopedia Virtual Dominicana

References 

1889 births
1945 deaths
20th-century Dominican Republic politicians
Dominican Republic people of Spanish descent
Leaders who took power by coup
People from Santiago de los Caballeros
Presidents of the Dominican Republic
Vice presidents of the Dominican Republic
White Dominicans